Cowpens may refer to:
 Battle of Cowpens, a battle in the American Revolution
 Cowpens National Battlefield, a unit of the National Park Service that protects the battlefield.
 Cowpens, South Carolina
 USS Cowpens (CG-63), a  guided-missile cruiser, commissioned 1991
 USS Cowpens (CVL-25), an aircraft carrier, commissioned 1943

See also
 Cowpen